Diana Poulton, also known as Edith Eleanor Diana Chloe Poulton née Kibblewhite (18 April 1903, Storington – 15 December 1995, Heyshott) was an English lutenist and musicologist.

From 1919 through 1923 she studied at the Slade School of Fine Art. She was a pupil of Arnold Dolmetsch (1922–5) and became a leading member of the early music revival. She played a key role in the revival of the popularity of the lute and its music. She was married in 1923 to the illustrator Tom Poulton whom she met when he was teaching at the Slade.

Bibliography 
Diana Poulton has been the subject of a full-length biography by Thea Abbott.

Footnotes

References 
 Curry, Donna, "Diana Poulton – An Appreciation of Her Life"  (LSA Quarterly, Vol. XXXI, February, 1996) (retrieved 03 Feb 2011)
 Abbott, Thea, Diana Poulton – The Lady with the Lute, Smokehouse Press, 2013

1903 births
English lutenists
1995 deaths
People from Heyshott
People from Storrington
20th-century English women musicians
Women performers of early music
English musicologists
Women musicologists
20th-century British musicologists